Minuscule 693 (in the Gregory-Aland numbering), ε1388 (von Soden), is a Greek minuscule manuscript of the New Testament, on parchment. Palaeographically it has been assigned to the 13th century. The manuscript is lacunose. Scrivener labelled it by 597e.

Description 

The codex contains the text of the four Gospels on 208 parchment leaves (size ), with lacuna (Mark 2:2-17; Luke 1:27-44; John 7:1-21:25). The text is written in one column per page, 21-24 lines per page.

Text 

Kurt Aland did not place the Greek text of the codex in any Category.

According to the Claremont Profile Method it represents textual group 16.

History 

Scrivener dated the manuscript to the 14th century, Gregory dated it to the 13th or 14th century. Currently the manuscript is dated by the INTF to the 13th century.

The manuscript was bought from Spyridion Lambros from Athens in 1859, along with 22 other manuscripts of the New Testament (codices: 688, 689, 690, 691, 692, etc.).

It was added to the list of New Testament manuscript by Scrivener (597) and Gregory (693).

It was examined by Samuel Thomas Bloomfield and Dean Burgon. Gregory saw the manuscript in 1883.

The manuscript is currently housed at the British Library (Add MS 22741) in London.

See also 

 List of New Testament minuscules
 Biblical manuscript
 Textual criticism

References

Further reading 

 S. T. Bloomfield, Critical Annotations: Additional and Supplementary on the New Testament (1860).
 W. H. P. Hatch, Facsimiles and descriptions of minuscule manuscripts of the New Testament, LXXIX (Cambridge, 1951).

Greek New Testament minuscules
13th-century biblical manuscripts
British Library additional manuscripts